Harold Howard O'Neill (12 October 1928 – 30 October 1983) was an Australian politician who represented the South Australian House of Assembly seat of Florey for the Labor Party from 1979 to 1982.

References

1928 births
1983 deaths
Members of the South Australian House of Assembly
Australian Labor Party members of the Parliament of South Australia
20th-century Australian politicians